This is a list of Muslim members of the United States Congress.

, only four Muslim Americans have ever been elected to Congress, the first being Keith Ellison in 2006. Three Muslims currently serve in Congress, all in the House of Representatives.

Senate

No Muslim has ever served in the United States Senate. In 2022, Mehmet Oz became the Republican nominee for Senate in Pennsylvania, making him the first Muslim to be nominated by a major party for the U.S. Senate. Oz lost the general election to Pennsylvania Lieutenant Governor John Fetterman.

House of Representatives

In addition to the representatives below, former representative Hansen Clarke (D) of Michigan, was raised in a Muslim family but converted to Catholicism.

See also
 List of Buddhist members of the United States Congress
 List of Hindu members of the United States Congress
 List of Jewish members of the United States Congress
 List of Mormon members of the United States Congress
 List of Quaker members of the United States Congress
 List of Arab and Middle Eastern Americans in the United States Congress

References

Muslim
 
United States Congress members